Vortice (i.e. "Vortex") is a 1953 Italian melodrama film directed by Raffaello Matarazzo and starring Massimo Girotti and Silvana Pampanini.

Plot

Cast  
Massimo Girotti as  Guido Aureli
Silvana Pampanini as  Elena Fanti
Franco Fabrizi as  Viaggiani
 Gianni Santuccio as  Luigi Moretti
 Maria Grazia Sandri as  Anna 
 Paolo Ferrara as  Cesare Fanti 
 Giorgio Capecchi as  Police Commissioner
Irene Papas as  Clara
Nino Marchesini as  Defense Attorney
Dina Perbellini as Nursing Sister
 Amina Pirani Maggi as  Guardian of the Prison
 Gualtiero De Angelis as Police Inspector  
 Giuseppe Chinnici as  Doctor
Aldo Silvani as  Head of the Hospital
 Bella Starace Sainati as Old Nun

References

External links

Italian drama films
1953 drama films
Films directed by Raffaello Matarazzo
1953 films
Melodrama films
1950s Italian films